The Old Lady and the Pigeons is a 1997 animated short film written and directed by Sylvain Chomet. It tells the slightly surreal story of a starving policeman who dresses up as a pigeon and tricks an old lady into feeding him. The film was produced through the French company Les Armateurs with support from companies in Canada, Belgium and the United Kingdom. It was Chomet's debut film and won several awards including the Grand Prix at the Annecy International Animated Film Festival.

Plot
An emaciated Parisian policeman discovers an old lady who feeds pigeons in the park excessively. After having a nightmare ending in giant pigeon-men pecking at his stomach, the policeman constructs a pigeon mask, which he wears to the old lady's home. She welcomes him inside and, despite his rude behavior, allows him to gorge himself. As weeks pass, the policeman grows increasingly fat. As he goes up flights of stairs to the woman's home each day, he passes a maid sweeping the floor.

Eventually, the policeman discovers the old lady's other pet: the woman who swept the floor, dressed as a cat. When the old lady spots the police man, she begins to pursue him with a large pair of shears. He tries to remove his fake pigeon head, to reveal himself as human, but it has become stuck around his neck. As the old lady is cornering him, the policeman falls out the window and onto the street, among a small group of pigeons. In the final scene the policeman, skinny once more and without his pigeon suit, is seen behaving like a pigeon in front of the Eiffel Tower.

Dialogue
In Tati-esque fashion, the bulk of the film is without any dialogue at all. And what there is in English: supplied by overweight American tourists in the opening and closing scenes.

Production
Sylvain Chomet had been based in London and worked as an animator in advertisement since the 1980s. He returned to his native France in 1990 and, inspired by Nick Park's Creature Comforts, set about making his own film. Chomet pitched The Old Lady and the Pigeons to Didier Brunner, producer at Les Amateurs, with whom he began to work on the film in 1991. The producers had difficulties raising enough money, but decided to start anyway, with money from the National Center of Cinematography. The backgrounds were designed by Nicolas de Crécy, who had studied with Chomet and previously collaborated on comics projects. The team produced the film's first four minutes at the Folimage studios in Bourg-lès-Valence. They then attempted to use the finished footage to attract more investors, but failed. In 1993, Chomet relocated to Canada in hope of a fresh start; however, Brunner suddenly managed to pre-sell the film to the BBC and several other broadcasters, and production could continue. Five years after production started the film was completed.

Reception
The film competed at the 1997 Annecy International Animated Film Festival. On 27 May 1998, it was released theatrically in France through Les Grands Films Classiques. It was screened together with the animated short film Bob's Birthday, directed by Alison Snowden and David Fine. Bernard Génin reviewed The Old Lady and the Pigeons for Télérama and called Chomet's directing "brilliant". He also complimented Crécy's background art, and wrote: "Paris streets, cozy interiors, characters' puffy faces – each shot is a beauty! Yes, the traditional, handmade cartoon can still surprise us."

Accolades
The film won the Grand Prix for best short film at the Annecy Festival. It went on to win the British BAFTA Award and Canadian Genie Award for Best Animated Short. It was nominated for best animated short at France's 1998 César Awards, and the United States' Academy Award for Best Animated Short Film at the 70th Academy Awards.

References
Notes

Bibliography

External links
 

1997 animated films
1997 comedy-drama films
1997 short films
Animated films about birds
Films directed by Sylvain Chomet
Animated films set in Paris
1990s French animated films
Canadian animated short films
Belgian animated short films
British animated short films
French animated short films
1990s animated short films
British drama short films
Folimage films
1990s English-language films
1990s Canadian animated films
1990s British animated films
British comedy short films
French comedy short films
French drama short films
Canadian comedy short films
Canadian drama short films
Films about old age